Kaitlyn Ashley (born June 29, 1971) is an American former pornographic actress active from 1993-1997.

Career and personal life
Ashley was born in Fort Lauderdale, Florida. Ashley entered the adult film industry in 1993; she retired from adult films in 1997. She appeared as herself in a 1998 episode of Louis Theroux's Weird Weekends.

Ashley was married to pornographic actor Jay Ashley until 1997, when they divorced.

Author Jacob Held argued that Kaitlyn Ashley, along with Jill Kelly and Jenna Jameson is considered to be one of the most iconic adult stars of the 1990s.

Awards
 1995 AVN Award – Best Supporting Actress—Video (Shame - Vivid)
 1996 AVN Award – Female Performer of the Year
 2001 AVN Hall of Fame inductee

References

External links
 
 
 

1971 births
Actresses from Fort Lauderdale, Florida
American pornographic film actresses
Living people
Pornographic film actors from Florida
21st-century American women